Thomas Harris (18 September 1905 - March 1985) was an English footballer. His regular position was as a forward. He was born in Ince-in-Makerfield, Lancashire. He played for Skelmersdale United, Wigan Borough, and Manchester United.

External links
MUFCInfo.com profile

1905 births
1985 deaths
English footballers
Skelmersdale United F.C. players
Manchester United F.C. players
People from Ince-in-Makerfield
Footballers from Greater Manchester
Association football forwards